Augusto Cesar Vatteone (24 October 1904 – 7 December 1979 in Buenos Aires) was an Argentine film director and screenwriter. His 1943 film Juvenilia was highly acclaimed in Argentina, and he won the Silver Condor Award for Best Director and Best Film for it at the 1944 Argentine Film Critics Association Awards.

Filmography 
Director
 Pibelandia (1935) 
 Giácomo (1939) 
 A Thief Has Arrived (1940)
 Juvenilia (1943)
 Al marido hay que seguirlo (1948)
 Cinco grandes y una chica (1950)
 Cinco locos en la pista (1950)
 El cura Lorenzo (1954)
 La muerte flota en el río (1956)

Screenwriter

 El último encuentro (1938)
 Giácomo (1939)
 Ha entrado un ladrón (1940)
 Mamá Gloria (1941)
 La muerte flota en el río (1956)

References

External links
 

Argentine film directors
Male screenwriters
1904 births
1979 deaths
Silver Condor Award for Best Director winners
20th-century Argentine screenwriters
20th-century Argentine male writers